Kishtwar Airstrip   is located about 3 kilometres north of Kishtwar near Chowgan Ground in Jammu and Kashmir, India. The Indian Army operates a helipad at this site to carry out helicopter operations to far-off areas of Doda and Kishtwar districts.

The airstrip will be upgraded for joint use by the Government of Jammu and Kashmir. A 1200 metre long airstrip will be developed over 20 acres of land. The upgrade work will be taken up by the Public Works Department for which the Government has acquired land in Pochhal, Matta and Kishtwar villages.

The airstrip has been included in the UDAN scheme, launched by the Ministry of Civil Aviation and is expected to help the promotion of tourism in the region.

References

Airports in Jammu and Kashmir
Proposed airports in Jammu and Kashmir